Aleksandr Dmitriyevich Yarkin (born 12 March 1969) is a Russian professional football coach and a former player.

Personal life
His brother Vladislav Yarkin was also a professional footballer. Vladislav's sons (and Aleksandr's nephews) Aleksandr Yarkin and Artyom Yarkin are footballers as well.

Honours
 Russian Second Division Zone East top scorer: 1997 (21 goals).

External links
 

1969 births
Sportspeople from Barnaul
Living people
Soviet footballers
Russian footballers
Association football defenders
FC Dynamo Barnaul players
Pakhtakor Tashkent FK players
FC Tyumen players
FC Sibir Novosibirsk players
Soviet Top League players
Russian Premier League players
Russian football managers
FC Novokuznetsk players